Tesano is a suburb of Accra, Ghana. It is on the main Accra Kumasi Highway before Achimota. The main campus of Ghana Technology University College is located inside Tesano.

References

Populated places in the Greater Accra Region